Booty may refer to:

Music
Booty music (also known as Miami bass or booty bass), a subgenre of hip hop
"Booty" (Jennifer Lopez song), 2014
Booty (Blac Youngsta song), 2017
Booty (C. Tangana and Becky G song), 2018
"Booty", a 1993 song by George Clinton from Paint the White House Black
"Booty", a 2000 song by Erykah Badu from Mama's Gun
"Booty", a 2007 song by Tito El Bambino from It's My Time (Tito El Bambino album)
Booty, a 2008 album by Die Türen
"Da Booty", a 1998 song by A Tribe Called Quest from The Love Movement
"Booty", a 2022 single by Latto and Saucy Santana that blew up online

People
Frederick Booty (1841–1924), philatelist
John Booty (b. 1965), American football player
John David Booty (b. 1985), American football player
Josh Booty (b. 1975), baseball and American football player
Justin Booty (b. 1976), soccer player
Kasma Booty (1932–2007), Malaysian actor
Martyn Booty (born 1971), footballer
Ray Booty (1932–2012), British cyclist
Booty Wood (1919–1987), stage name of American jazz trombonist Mitchell W. Wood

Other uses
Booty (video game), released in 1984
Booty v Barnaby, court case
Booty Edwards & Partners, Malaysian architecture company
"Booty", a term for the buttocks
Bootie, or bootee, a short soft sock or bootlike foot garment
Booty (loot), goods or treasure seized by force
Pirate's Booty, puffed rice snack

See also
Bootie (disambiguation)
Booty Bounce (disambiguation)
Booty Call (disambiguation)
Booty Luv